Shropshire County Cricket Club was established on 28 June 1956. It has since played minor counties cricket from 1957 and played List A cricket from 1974 to 2005, using a different number of home grounds during that time. Their first home minor counties fixture in 1957 was against  Staffordshire at The Grove Ground, Market Drayton, while their first List A match came 17 years later against Essex in the 1974 Gillette Cup at Orleton Park, Wellington.

The sixteen grounds that Shropshire have used for home matches since 1955 are listed below, with statistics complete through to the end of the 2014 season.

Grounds

List A
Below is a complete list of grounds used by Shropshire County Cricket Club when it was permitted to play List A matches. These grounds have also held Minor Counties Championship and MCCA Knockout Trophy matches.

Minor Counties
Below is a complete list of grounds used by Shropshire County Cricket Club in Minor Counties Championship and MCCA Knockout Trophy matches.

Notes

References

Shropshire County Cricket Club
Cricket grounds in Shropshire
Shropshire